Parlez-Vous Hate? is the fourteenth album by Luxembourgish neofolk project Rome. It was released on January 29, 2021, on Trisol Music Group.

Background 
Parlez-Vous Hate? was released shortly after Rome's previous album, The Lone Furrow. Project leader Jérôme Reuter wrote that he was able to release this album so quickly because of the free time due to the COVID-19 pandemic cancelling his live performances, giving him more free time to spend in the studio.

Two singles from the album were released on YouTube prior to the album release: "Panzerschokolade", on December 31, 2020, and "Parlez-Vous Hate?", on January 21, 2021.

Critical reception 

Parlez-Vous Hate? was largely well received by critics. It received favourable write-ups in publications such as Amboss-Mag, Antyradio, PlanetMosh, VerdamMnis Magazine, and Ver Sacrum.

Track Listing

References 

2021 albums
Rome (band) albums